Luminaris is a 2011 short film directed by Juan Pablo Zaramella, which uses the pixilation technique to blend real actors with animated objects. The film won awards at 324 international film festivals, including the Woodstock Film Festival and Annecy International Animated Film Festival. It won the FIPRESCI prize and made the shortlist for the Academy Award for Best Animated Short Film. The film incorporates several styles, such as art deco, tango, surrealism, and neorealism.
The production of the film took more than 2 and a half years, due to the difficulty of combining pixilation techniques with the movement of natural sunlight.

Plot
Set in Buenos Aires, Luminaris is the fantastical story of a man who works in a factory making light bulbs, but yearns for something more.

References

External links
 
 

2011 films
2011 short films
Films shot in Buenos Aires
Films set in Buenos Aires
Argentine animated short films
Argentine short films